Nallavan is a 1988 Indian Tamil-language action film, directed by S. P. Muthuraman and produced by Kalaipuli S. Thanu and Ibrahim Rowther. It stars Vijayakanth, Raadhika and M. N. Nambiar. The film, released on 15 August 1988, was a success at the box office.

Plot 

Gurumoorthy and Raja are twin brothers. Guru is set to marry a collector. On the day of the marriage, Raja is kidnapped and shown a photo where he is stabbing Manju. Raja realises it is Guru in the photo. What transpires later forms the crux of the story.

Cast 
Vijayakanth as Lawyer Gurumoorthy "Guru" and Raja
Raadhika as Collector Ponni
M. N. Nambiar as Guru and Raja's father
S. S. Chandran as Point
Janagaraj as Madhu
Kitty as Vikram
Vani Viswanath as Radha
Manimala as Guru and Raja's mother
Disco Shanti as Manju
Thyagu as Peter
Charle as Raja's friend
Chinni Jayanth as Raja's friend
Achamillai Gopi as Shankar

Production 
The stunt scenes and a song was picturised and shot at Kashmir. Muthuraman revealed that crew faced tough time to shoot at the 600 feet hills for a song sequence.

Soundtrack 
The music was composed by Chandrabose and the lyrics were written by Thanu.

Reception 
N. Krishnaswamy of The Indian Express wrote, "The script is full of holes [..] Thanu, the producer of the film is credited with the script too. He has only himself to blame. S. P. Muthuraman directs the film as best as he can within the limitations of the canvass". Jayamanmadhan of Kalki also criticised the film for its writing.

References

External links 
 

1980s Tamil-language films
1988 action films
1988 films
Films directed by S. P. Muthuraman
Films scored by Chandrabose (composer)
Indian action films
Twins in Indian films